Pleckstrin Homology domain containing Family  M Member 3, or PLEKHM3, is the hypothetical protein that in humans is encoded by the PLEKHM3 gene. PLEKHM3 is also known as DAPR (differentiation associated protein),  and Pleckstrin Homology Domain Containing Family M, Member 1-like.

Gene 
PLEKHM3 is a valid, protein coding gene that is located on the minus strand of the q-arm of chromosome 2. Its exact location is 2q33.3. Its genomic mRNA length is 9,807 base pairs.
Its genomic DNA length is 24.3 kilobases. It has 8 exons, 4 common splice forms.

Protein 

PLEKHM3 contains a Plekstrin Homology domain and a C-terminal Rubicon Homology domain (RH domain). Rubicon homology domains of other proteins (e.g., Rubicon and PLEKHM1), have been shown to mediate interaction with the small GTPase Rab7. The RH domain domain is conserved in PLEKHM3 homologs as distant as the Nile Tilapia. 

The molecular weight of PLEKHM3 87.2 kilodaltons. Its isoelectric point is 6.81. It is predicted to be localized primarily in the cytosol. PLEKHM3 has orthologs in eukaryotes.

Function 
The function of PLEKHM3 is not characterized in any scientific database. It is thought to be associated with cell differentiation and is expressed at ubiquitously low levels in all cell types. The Pleckstrin Homology domains are involved with phosphate binding.

Interactions 
PLEKHM3 is thought to interact with a protein called GDAP1, which is responsible for differentiation in neuronal cell types and plays a role in the signal transduction pathway. This also supports the predicted role of PLEKHM3 in differentiation.

References

External links 
 NCBI (National Center for Biotechnology Information)

Genes on human chromosome 2